Terence Charles 'Terry' Beers was an Australian rugby league footballer who played in the 1940s.

Beers was graded at St. George in 1945 and played great football to be promoted from Third Grade to First Grade in his debut year. Over the next couple of seasons he remained at the club, regularly playing lower grades until 1948 when he retired. 

Beers died on 19 March 2015 at Kogarah, New South Wales. He was later cremated at Woronora Crematorium, Sutherland.

References

St. George Dragons players
Australian rugby league players
Rugby league players from Sydney
Rugby league centres
1925 births
2015 deaths